Barney Rock (born 10 January 1961) is a former Gaelic footballer and manager at club and inter-county level (he managed Westmeath in the mid-1990s).

Biography
Born in Ballymun, but growing up in Glasnevin, Dublin, Rock attended St Kevins College, Ballygall.

He played Gaelic football with his local club Ballymun Kickhams and was a senior member of the Dublin county team from 1980 until 1991. He won the 1983 All-Ireland Senior Football Championship with Dublin in 1983 at Croke Park against Galway. Rock was also chosen to play in the first International Rules Series against Australia in 1984. Rock won an All Star for Dublin on three occasions, each in consecutive years 1983, 1984, 1985.

After hanging up his boots, Rock went on to manage both the Westmeath senior and under 21 teams from 1995 to 1997 and was managing Dublin GAA club St Sylvester's in 2000.

Rock was an unsuccessful candidate at the 1991 Dublin City Council election for the Progressive Democrats. He stood for election to the Finglas ward of Dublin Corporation.

Rock's son, Dean, would later play for Dublin.

References

1961 births
Living people
Ballymun Kickhams Gaelic footballers
Dublin inter-county Gaelic footballers
Gaelic football forwards
Gaelic football managers
Irish international rules football players
Irish sportsperson-politicians
Politicians from Dublin (city)
Progressive Democrats politicians
Singing talent show winners
Sportspeople from Dublin (city)
Winners of one All-Ireland medal (Gaelic football)
You're a Star contestants